William Timothy Lollar (born March 17, 1956) is a former professional baseball pitcher. He was born in Missouri to Homer and Betty Jean (nee McHenry) Lollar. Tim was a graduate of Farmington High School in Farmington, Missouri, and Mineral Area College in Flat River, Missouri. Lollar played all or parts of seven seasons in Major League Baseball from 1980 to 1986 for the New York Yankees (1980), San Diego Padres (1981–84), Chicago White Sox (1985) and Boston Red Sox (1985–86), primarily as a starting pitcher.

Early career
Lollar played collegiately for the University of Arkansas. He was drafted by the Yankees in the fourth round of the 1978 Major League Baseball Draft and was immediately assigned to the Double-A West Haven Yankees, two steps below the majors.  Lollar played 28 games as an infielder in 1978 and 65 games as an infielder in 1979 for the West Haven Yankees both years.  He made his major league debut in 1980 as a pitcher.

Major league career

New York Yankees
Lollar debuted for the Yankees on June 26, 1980. He made 14 appearances for New York, including one start. He went 1–0 with 2 saves and a 3.34 earned run average. Lollar was traded to the Padres near the end of spring training 1981, along with three other players, for outfielder Jerry Mumphrey and pitcher John Pacella.

San Diego Padres

Lollar spent the strike-shortened 1981 season splitting time between the starting rotation and the bullpen for the Padres. He had a record of 2–8 in 24 games, including 11 starts, and an ERA of 6.10.

In 1982, Lollar was installed in the starting rotation permanently. He rewarded the Padres with a career-high 16 wins while lowering his ERA to 3.13. He was in turn rewarded by being made the Padres' Opening Day starter in 1983, but he slumped badly, posting a record of 7–12 with an ERA of 4.61.

The Padres made the postseason for the first time as a franchise in 1984, with Lollar going 11–13 with a 3.91 ERA. He made two postseason starts—one each in the NLCS and the World Series—but did not make it out of the fifth inning in either one. In the third game of the World Series, against the Detroit Tigers, Lollar pitched just 1.2 innings, giving up four runs, including a home run to Marty Castillo. After the season, he was traded to the White Sox, along with Ozzie Guillén, Bill Long and Luis Salazar, primarily in exchange for LaMarr Hoyt.

Later career
Lollar stayed with the White Sox for just a few months before being traded to the Red Sox for outfielder Reid Nichols. In 1986, the Red Sox converted Lollar into a relief pitcher, but Lollar posted a 6.91 ERA while giving up nearly two baserunners per inning. While his 1986 season with the eventual American League champion Red Sox was forgettable, Lollar was undefeated, going 2-0. He had one win as a starter and one win as a relief pitcher.  He was released during spring training in 1987. Lollar played that season in the minors, posting a record of 3–4 with an ERA of 5.87 while splitting the year between the Detroit Tigers and St. Louis Cardinals organizations. He retired after the season. In his 7 seasons he had a 47-52 win–loss record, 199 games pitched of which 131 were started, 9 complete games, 4 shutouts, 20 games finished, 906 innings pitched, 841 hits allowed, 459 runs allowed, 430 earned runs allowed, 93 home runs allowed, 480 walks allowed of which 21 were intentional, 600 strikeouts and a 4.27 ERA. His career WHIP was 1.458.

As a hitter
Lollar was considered a particularly good hitter for a pitcher, being asked to occasionally pinch-hit, and hitting eight career home runs in four seasons in the National League. He posted a .234 batting average (54-for-231) with 27 runs, 38 RBI and 18 bases on balls. He was even called upon to pinch-hit for position players twice while with the American League Red Sox. The first was on August 13, 1985, when he pinch hit for shortstop Jackie Gutiérrez, popping out to third base. The second was on August 12, 1986. Lollar pinch-hit for shortstop Rey Quiñones with two out in the 9th and the tying run on first base. Despite not having batted in a major league game in nearly a year, Lollar singled off Kansas City Royals closer Dan Quisenberry. Unfortunately for the Red Sox, the next batter, Wade Boggs, grounded out to end the game.

Personal life

After baseball, Lollar became a PGA golf pro and instructor at Lakewood, Colorado.  He is the father of two sons and one daughter.

Notes

External links
, or Retrosheet
Pelota Binaria (Venezuelan Winter League)

1956 births
Living people
Arkansas Razorbacks baseball players
Baseball players from Missouri
Boston Red Sox players
Cardenales de Lara players
American expatriate baseball players in Venezuela
Chicago White Sox players
Columbus Clippers players
Louisville Redbirds players
Major League Baseball pitchers
New York Yankees players
People from Poplar Bluff, Missouri
San Diego Padres players
Toledo Mud Hens players
West Haven Yankees players
All-American college baseball players
Mineral Area Cardinals baseball players
Alaska Goldpanners of Fairbanks players